Bouchraya Hammoudi Bayoun (in ; born 9 July 1954) is a Sahrawi politician and has been Prime Minister of the Sahrawi Arab Democratic Republic since 13 January 2020. He was a former ambassador to Algeria, with a base in Algiers. He has been prime minister of the Sahrawi Republic twice.

Career 
Bouchraya was born at Dakhla in 1954. He studied Economics at the University of Havana, Cuba. He speaks Hassaniya (a variety of Arabic) & Spanish. He has held various positions in the Sahrawi government in exile. He started off his political career as the Minister of Trade and Development, when the former education minister Mohamed Lamine Ould Ahmed became the Prime Minister in December 1985.

He was selected as the Prime Minister in 1993 and served for a two-year term. He then served as the Economic Development & Trade Minister. He subsequently became the Prime Minister again between 1999 and 2003, during which he also served as the Minister of Interior.

Bouchraya called for a renewed emphasis on United Nations Mission for the Referendum in Western Sahara's mandate during his second Prime Ministerial tenure and pledged to accept the outcome of a free referendum regardless of whether the popular opinion was for integrating with Morocco. He was also critical of the new king Mohammed VI of Morocco, who he claimed was violating the rights of the Sahrawi people.

Bouchraya was appointed as the POLISARIO representative for Spain in 2008 replacing Brahim Ghali, who became the Sahrawi Republic ambassador in Algiers. When Brahim Ghali became the president of SADR, Bouchraya replaced him as the SADR representative at Algiers.

References 

Sahrawi expatriates in Spain
Living people
People from Dakhla, Western Sahara
Polisario Front politicians
Prime Ministers of the Sahrawi Arab Democratic Republic
University of Havana alumni
Sahrawi Sunni Muslims
Place of birth missing (living people)
Sahrawi diplomats
1954 births